Lužec nad Cidlinou is a municipality and village in Hradec Králové District in the Hradec Králové Region of the Czech Republic. It has about 500 inhabitants.

Geography
It lies in a flat agricultural landscape of the East Elbe Table. The Lužecký brook flows though the municipality. The river Cidlina, which is included in the name of the municipality, flows east of the village, outside of the municipal territory.

History
The first written mention of Lužec nad Cidlinou is from 1325. Important owners of the village included the Lords of Landštejn, the Lords of Postupim, the Pernštejn family and the Kinsky family.

Sights
The landmark of the village is the Church of Saint George, built in 1872. Other sights include Memorial to the Victims of World War I from 1928, Memorial of Jan Hus from 1931, Chapel of the Virgin Mary and statue of Saint Leonard of Noblac, which originally stood in the monastery garden of Loreta in Chlumec nad Cidlinou.

References

External links

Villages in Hradec Králové District